R. Paramashivan is an Indian musician and director associated with Karnataka theatre. Paramashivan works as a singer, instrumentalist, and composer. He was awarded the Sangeet Natak Akademi Award for theatre music in 2005.

References

Indian male singers
Indian theatre directors
Living people
Musicians from Karnataka
Recipients of the Sangeet Natak Akademi Award
Recipients of the Rajyotsava Award 2005
Year of birth missing (living people)